The tête à Toto is a French typographical design and children's game, well known to French schoolchildren.
It consists of the equation "0+0=0", written with the first two "0"s for eyes, the "+" for a nose, the "=" for a mouth, and the final "0" surrounding, as a stylized face or skull.

It is drawn while reciting:

Translated:

As his head equals zero, it means that his intelligence is null.

The name, or character, of Toto is a common stock character in French culture; he is the generic child used in jokes ("Toto asks his mother..."). See Blague de Toto (Toto joke).

Other uses

A circumlocution for "zero"
In prostitution, slang for a prostitute – or rather, prospective prostitute – who has not had a single client (i.e., who has had zero clients).

See also
Henohenomoheji, similar typographical face in Japanese
Mondgesicht, similar typographical face in German, consisting of "Punkt, Punkt, Komma, Strich": . . , –

References

La tête à Toto 
Zéro plus zéro ? La tête à Toto... 

French culture
Typography
Doodling motifs

fr:Blague de Toto#La tête à Toto